Lygne is a lake in the municipality of Hægebostad in Agder county, Norway. The  lake is part of the river Lygna. Part of the western shore has fairly steep cliffs overlooking the lake, but the rest of the shoreline is relatively flat with houses and roads.

See also
List of lakes in Norway

References

Hægebostad
Lakes of Agder